Lisa Hespe  is an Australian jurist who has served as a judge of the Federal Court of Australia since 27 April 2022. Hespe replaced Justice Paul Anastassiou. Hespe completed her secondary education at Leibler Yavneh College. She then completed a Bachelor of Economics in 1991 and a Bachelor of Laws with Honours in 1994 at Monash University. She earned a Master of Laws from Melbourne Law School in 2022. Hespe commenced her legal career practising as a lawyer with law firm King & Wood Mallesons, where she specialised in taxation and mergers and acquisitions. She is a lecturer at the University of Melbourne, where she teaches tax litigation and has spent time as a Senior Member of the Administrative Appeals Tribunal. Hespe identifies as Jewish.

References 

21st-century judges
Australian Jews
Australian jurists
Australian women judges
Judges of the Federal Court of Australia
Living people
Monash University alumni
Melbourne Law School alumni
Year of birth missing (living people)